The 2010 elections for the Michigan House of Representatives were held on November 2, 2010, with partisan primary elections held August 3, 2010, to determine the party's nominees.

Candidates

Impact of term limits
Due to term limit provisions in Michigan's Constitution, 54 candidates were unable to seek re-election to the House, resulting in the largest turnover in the lower chamber since the adoption of term limits in 1992.

Results

Districts 1–28

Districts 29–55

Districts 56–83

Districts 84–110

By-elections
On September 9, 2011, State Representative Tim Melton resigned to accept a position in the organization StudentsFirst, founded by Michelle Rhee. The by-election to fill the vacancy in the seat was held February 28, 2012, and was won by Tim Greimel, the current House minority leader.

On November 8, 2011, State Representative Paul Scott was recalled. The by-election to fill the vacancy in the seat was held February 28, 2012, and was won by Joe Graves.

See also
2010 Michigan Senate election

References
Gongwer News Service: 2010 General Election—Michigan House

House of Representatives
2010
Michigan House of Representatives
November 2010 events in the United States